Volodymyr Ivanov (8 February 1936 – 21 August 2021) was a Belarusian boxer. He competed in the men's light flyweight event at the 1972 Summer Olympics, representing the Soviet Union.

References

1936 births
2021 deaths
Belarusian male boxers
Olympic boxers of the Soviet Union
Boxers at the 1972 Summer Olympics
Sportspeople from Gomel
Light-flyweight boxers
20th-century Belarusian people